Apostlethrips is a genus of thrips in the family Phlaeothripidae, first described by Laurence Mound and Kamb Minaei in 2006.  The type species is Apostlethrips apostus. The members of this genus are found only in Australia, in the Northern Territory and Western Australia,  at the base of grass tussocks where they are believed to feed on fungal hyphae.

Species
As listed by GBIF:
Apostlethrips apostus 
Apostlethrips poaceaeus 
Apostlethrips pygus

References

Phlaeothripidae
Thrips
Thrips genera
Taxa named by Laurence Alfred Mound
Insects described in 2006
Fauna of the Northern Territory
Fauna of Western Australia